Norman Albert Mott, (April 4, 1855 – July 16, 1920), was a member of the Mississippi House of Representatives from 1912 to 1916.

Early life

Mott was born in Alburgh, Vermont to Nichols and Amanda (Chilton) Mott. Mr. Mott and his 2 brothers were orphaned at a young age. His father died in 1856 and his mother in 1863. He was raised by his grandmother Phoebe Deuel Chilton in Vermont until he moved south due to health reasons.

While a member of the Mississippi Legislature, Mott served as Chairman of the Investigation of State Officers committee and was a member of the Ways and Means, Municipalities, and Liquor Traffic committees. He was also a publisher of the Yazoo Herald, a newspaper in Yazoo City, Mississippi and the Belzoni Item. The Yazoo Herald remained in the Mott family from 1914 until 1978. He served as president of the Farmers' Union in Mississippi and belonged to the fraternal organization Woodmen of the World.

References 

1855 births
Democratic Party members of the Mississippi House of Representatives
1920 deaths
19th-century American newspaper publishers (people)
Methodists from Mississippi
People from Alburgh, Vermont
People from Yazoo City, Mississippi
Journalists from Mississippi